Inden may refer to:

People
 Gottfried Inden (1827–1896), American politician
 Ronald Inden, American indologist

Places
 Inden, North Rhine-Westphalia, Germany
 Inden, Switzerland